Abbey-Leigh Stringer (born 17 May 1995) is an English football midfielder who plays for West Ham United in the FA Women's Super League.

Club career
Stringer spent her youth development with Aston Villa's center of excellence. Her performances and development there earned her call-ups for England's youth national teams at various levels.

In June 2014, Stringer signed with WSL 1 side and cross-town rivals, Birmingham City After limited appearances for Birmingham, she was loaned back to Aston Villa in July 2015 to gain more experience and develop her skills.

At the conclusion of her loan spell, she returned to Birmingham and signed a professional deal in January 2016. During her time with Birmingham she would make 37 league appearances, 6 WSL Cup appearances, and help the Blues finish as runners up in the 2016 WSL Cup and the 2016–17 FA Women's Cup.

In August 2018, Stringer signed for Everton

International career
Stringer has made appearances for various youth levels of the England national team from U-17s through U-23s. She contributed 2 starts and 3 appearances for England during their runner-up finish in the 2013 UEFA Women's Under-19 Championship.

References

External links
 
 
 England FA player profile
 Aston Villa player profile
 Birmingham City player profile

Living people
1995 births
English women's footballers
Women's association football midfielders
Women's Super League players
Birmingham City W.F.C. players
Aston Villa W.F.C. players
Everton F.C. (women) players
West Ham United F.C. Women players
England women's youth international footballers